Brigadier John Durival Kemp, 1st Viscount Rochdale OBE, TD, DL (5 June 1906 – 24 May 1993), was a British peer, soldier and businessman.

Early life
Kemp was the eldest son of George Kemp, 1st Baron Rochdale, and Lady Beatrice Mary Egerton, third daughter of Francis Egerton, 3rd Earl of Ellesmere. His father was a Member of Parliament for Heywood and Manchester North West and served as chairman of Kelsall & Kemp, flannel manufacturers.

He was educated at Eton College and Trinity College, Cambridge where he took a degree in Natural Sciences.

Career
Kemp served in the Second World War with U.S. Forces in the Pacific and with the British Army in India, where he was mentioned in despatches, and achieved the rank of Brigadier. He succeeded to the barony on his father's death in 1945. Lord Rochdale was Chairman of the family firm of Kelsall & Kemp from 1950 to 1971, a Member of the Central Transport Consultative Committees from 1952 to 1957, President of the National Union of Manufacturers from 1953 to 1956, a Governor of the BBC from 1954 to 1959 and Chairman of the Cotton Board from 1957 to 1962, when the industry was suffering significant challenges from imports.

He was also a Member of the House of Lords European Select Committee from 1981 to 1986 and a Deputy Lieutenant of Cumbria from 1948 to 1983. In 1960, he was created Viscount Rochdale, of Rochdale in the County Palatine of Lancaster.  Kemp was a Conservative, becoming Chairman of the Rochdale Conservative Association in the 1930s, and on becoming Lord Rochdale in 1945 on the death of his father, he was an active member of the House of Lords. He was at one time President of the Economic League.

Personal life
Lord Rochdale married Elinor Dorothea Pease on 18 March 1931. Elinor was the second daughter of Ernest Hubert Pease, OBE, of Ledge House in Bembridge, Isle of Wight, and Mowden in Darlington.  They had two children:

 St John Durival Kemp, 2nd Viscount Rochdale (1938–2015), who married Serena Jane Clark-Hall, daughter of James Edward Michael Clark-Hall in 1960. They divorced in 1974 and he married Elizabeth (née Boldon) Anderton, the former wife of James Michael Anderton and daughter of Robert Norman Rossiter Boldon.
 Hon. Bryony Joy Kemp (1947–1963), who died unmarried.

Rochdale died on 24 May 1993.

Arms

References

External links

 Kemp family history 1714 to present
 John Durival Kemp, 1st Viscount Rochdale (1906-1993), Businessman; son of 1st Baron Rochdale at the National Portrait Gallery, London.

1906 births
1993 deaths
20th-century British businesspeople
Officers of the Order of the British Empire
Alumni of Trinity College, Cambridge
People educated at Eton College
British Army personnel of World War II
Place of birth missing
Royal Artillery officers
Barons created by George VI
Viscounts created by Elizabeth II